The Chief of Defence People is the senior military officer in the British Armed Forces responsible for the policies and processes concerning the management of British military personnel across the Royal Navy, British Army, Royal Air Force and Ministry of Defence civil service. Created by re-designating the Deputy Chief of the Defence Staff (Personnel and Training) in 2013, the post was initially titled as the Chief of Defence Personnel.  In April 2014, MOD civilian personnel policy was added to the post's responsibility.

Chiefs of Defence Personnel
2013 – 2016 Lieutenant-General Andrew Gregory

Chiefs of Defence People
2016 – 2020 Lieutenant General Richard Nugee
2020 – 2023 Lieutenant General James Swift
2023 – present Vice Admiral Philip Hally

References

British military appointments